Pooh were an Italian pop band formed in 1966 in Bologna.
Over the course of their career, Pooh has sold over 100 million records. Some of the band's most popular songs include "Parsifal", "Dove comincia il sole" and "Pensiero".

History

1960s
The first nucleus of the future Pooh was born as Jaguars in 1962 in Bologna from the meeting between the drummer Valerio Negrini and the guitarist Mauro Bertoli. In 1964 he arrives at the first stable formation: the aforementioned Negrini and Bertoli plus Vittorio Costa (vocals), Giancarlo Cantelli (bass) and Bruno Barraco (rhythm guitar and keyboards). In 1965 Vittorio Costa leaves to continue his medical studies while Bob Gillot (keyboards) and Mario Goretti on rhythm guitar enter. During his stay in the Goretti group he was second guitarist and singer, but also bassist, harmonica player and accordionist, as well as curator of the choirs on the albums Per those like us and Contrasto. Gilberto Faggioli takes the place of Cantelli.

In January 1966 the Negrini-Bertoli-Goretti-Faggioli-Gillot quintet gets a contract with Vedette, Armando Sciascia's record company which, having lost Equipe 84 at that time, is looking for a new rock group. Since there is a Roman formation with the same name (the Jaguars) that has already recorded a single, a new name must be found; this was provided by the secretary of Sciascia himself, [3] Aliki Andris, a fan of the Winnie-the-Pooh teddy bear. [3] (A stylized teddy bear would appear on the covers of numerous vinyls up to the threshold of the 1990's.) [3]

In February 1966 the band recorded the first single: Come out of the cover of the song Continua su Running by the Spencer Davis Group. Then he participates in the television program Settevoci, in which he presents the song What you do not know, cover of Rag doll by Four Seasons, published as side B of Bikini Beat, the second single released in May, which is commissioned to the quintet as an advertising jingle by of a major lipstick brand. At the end of April the young Roby Facchinetti from Bergamo replaces Bob Gillot on keyboards. In the summer of the same year Riccardo Fogli enters a distant part of the complex that replaces Gilberto Faggioli, abruptly "fired" from Bertoli & company. The meeting between the former singer of Slenders, a rock group from Piombino, and the Pooh group takes place at the Piper in Milan.

In October 1966 the quintet participated in the Rose Festival with the song Brennero '66 which was censored by RAI as it deals with terrorism in South Tyrol. Valerio Negrini is therefore forced to quickly write an alternative text for the song, which is presented as The bells of silence and ranks in the last place of the event. The first album For those like us is released at the end of the year and features the re-recordings of the songs released on 45s performed with the new lineup plus other songs; it sells over 15,000 copies and includes six covers and six songs written by the duo Facchinetti-Negrini who, however, do not sign the songs, as they are not yet registered with SIAE. A quarter of a century after their publication (1991), Facchinetti and Negrini were finally able to regain possession of it with a phone call to Armando Sciascia. Roby himself sums up: «Listening to his voice again was an emotion. He spoke very nice words about the Poohs. I thanked him. He had been a kind of father to us. When we lacked the money to put gas in the van, it was often he who handed it to us. '

In April 1967, Vedette released the fourth single In the dark / Cose di this world. Immediately afterwards Mauro Bertoli marries a young dancer and decides to abandon his musical career. From that moment on, the line-up stabilizes in a quartet.

In April 1968 the quartet knows for the first time the thrill of the record charts with the song Piccola Katy, originally side B of their fifth single In Silenzio, which climbs up to the fifteenth position of the hit parade. Shortly after the release of the album, after the tour of summer concerts (September 1968), Mario Goretti, tired of the constant movements around Italy, leaves the complex and returns to Bologna, where he opens an amplifier company. Despite the success of the single In Silenzio / Piccola Katy, in whose recording he participated as a guitarist (he is the intro of the B side).

Goretti is replaced by the young Bolognese guitarist Donato Battaglia known as Dodi, not even seventeen years old. Dodi had been noticed by Enrico Marescotti during a Bolognese party in which he performed a virtuoso electric solo by the Shadows. A member of the Meteors, who were also Gianni Morandi's musical ensemble, he becomes a protagonist of the growth of Pooh behind the scenes.

In that same year, the relationship between Pooh and the record company breaks down following the release of their second album Contrasto in July 1968: secretly released while the band is on tour, the record is withdrawn from the market shortly after. In fact, this album mainly includes auditions and discards, as well as the fairly successful single Piccola Katy.

1970s
In 1971 the Pooh moved to CBS and with the producer Giancarlo Lucariello the first great satisfactions arrived. The single Tanta Voglia di Lei reaches number one in two weeks. The same happens with Pensiero, which sells over a million copies. Although everyone considers it a piece of love, the song is about a prisoner. Both singles entered the South American charts and immediately jumped to the top, selling 450,000 and 1,200,000 copies respectively in a few months. [4] The album Opera Prima is released, an LP that blends symphonic music, as in the song of the same name, with Italian melody.

Valerio Negrini leaves the group, while remaining tied to the Pooh as a lyricist. He is replaced by Stefano D'Orazio, a Roman drummer who had already played in groups such as I Naufraghi and Il Punto (the second of the two groups had obtained a moderate success, also obtaining a cover on Ciao 2001, the most prestigious music weekly of those years [5] The Pooh record some of their songs in English: Tutto alle Tre becomes The Suitcase and CBS decides to include it in a collection that includes the best artists of their vast catalog. Tanta Voglia di Lei comes second at the Festivalbar.

In 1972, the worldwide success is still affirmed, thanks to singles of great effect and drama such as Noi due nel mondo e nell'anima (b-side Nacerò con te), What can be said about you (back When a she goes away). The record company is undecided on which of the two singles to bet more. So, in order not to do a wrong either to the interpretation of Dodi in Noi due nel mondo e nell'ima or to the increasingly indolent Riccardo di Nacerò con te, he decides to publish the single as a Doppio Lato A, choosing a white cover with just the name of the group in the foreground and the photo of the four. The role of song to be included in the juke-box is reserved for Nascerò con te, while Noi due nel mondo e nell'anima will become the song intended for radio promotion. From London comes the Minimoog synthesizer, which makes a fleeting appearance in this piece. The Alessandra album marks a greater presence of Roby on vocals, which until then had been the prerogative of Dodi and Riccardo above all, and for the first time sees the signature of Dodi Battaglia as the author of the music.

Due to the influence of Lucariello, the ensemble puts aside its instrumental skills to make room for the strings of the very elegant Franco Monaldi orchestra. In addition to this, for the first and only time in Alessandra the producer manages to impose that the album is composed exclusively of love songs. It is a record where the electric guitar almost totally disappears, replaced mainly by Dodi's acoustic arpeggios, there are no guitar solos to hinder the orchestral ups and downs of the 12 songs of which the disc is composed. At this point Riccardo Fogli decides to leave the group to pursue a solo career. In fact, according to him, the producer tends to favor Battaglia's voice to the detriment of his. The group seems to be about to dissolve when at the beginning of 1973, after endless selections held in the laundry of a hotel on the Tuscan-Emilian Apennines in Roncobilaccio, the new bassist, Red Canzian, former guitarist of Osage Tribe, a group founded by Franco Battiato, who later joined Capsicum Red, who had two singles and an album to his credit. [6]

In 1973 the album Parsifal was released, a complex and wide-ranging instrumental and lyrical LP. Anticipated by the singles Io e Te Per Altri Giorni and Infiniti Noi, this LP uniquely mixes British-derived symphonic pop in the Italian panorama with the sophisticated melodies of Roby Facchinetti as in the homonymous Parsifal or in L'anno, Il Posto, L'Ora. If the musical style seems to direct them towards cumbersome comparisons like Pink Floyd and Genesis, the choirs of the four refer directly to the Beatles and the Bee Gees. The song of the same name marks an important stage in the history of the ensemble as its second part is exclusively instrumental. The song Letter from Marienbad is chosen as Side B of the single Io e Te Per Altri Giorni and left out of the 33 rpm version of the album, although it is regularly included in the stereo 8 version of the same.

In 1974 the collection I Pooh 1971-1974 was released which contains their success motifs. They are included in the album If you know, if you can, if you want and For you something more, used as side A of the relative single, which also include E I would like. The songs, arranged according to a fairly rigid chronological criterion, clearly highlight how rapid the musical maturation in the style of the Pooh has been in these four years. The two singles, however, do not reach the success of the previous ones. 1975 is a year of transition. The remarkable load of symphonic music as well as often dreamlike and difficult lyrics come together in two LPs of modest commercial success. Some of our best time comes across as too difficult an LP for the Pooh audience, accustomed to fast-paced songs. The massive use of the orchestra, of instruments such as the harpsichord and of long instrumental pieces certainly does not favor the radio passage. Not even the following Perhaps poetry still manages to sell like Parsifal: Ninna nanna, chosen to promote the album, barely manages to enter the top 10 of singles. [7] The orchestral-based arrangements had been imposed by the producer Lucariello, while the group had spoken out for acoustic arrangements. The album is produced rather quickly, it is less difficult and edited than the previous one and Pooh will perform live very few songs from this album.

Just around 1975 for the first time in the seventies several other Italian groups, such as the Bottega dell'Arte, the Giardino dei Semplici, the Beans and the Matia Bazar, [8] more or less simultaneously succeeded in gaining public attention by placing one or two singles in the sales charts obtaining sales figures certainly comparable to those of the latest Pooh singles. As Lucariello is no longer able to perpetuate the success of the group, the disagreements intensify. The desire to continue playing by reducing the contribution of the orchestra finally leads the group to self-produce, the first case of its kind in Italy, and to definitively split from the producer who had led them to success. Songs like Pierre and Linda, with which Pooh participate in the Festivalbar and which Miguel Bosé will sing in Spanish obtaining success, and the album Poohlover mark a clear change from the recent past. The music is played by the four with richer arrangements, although there is still the accompaniment of a string section. The lyrics no longer focus only on love, but approach everyday life and social issues; in fact, Poohlover speaks of homosexuals, prostitutes, gypsies and prisoners. With Linda the group returns after a few years to the top of the charts; in Piazza San Marco in Venice, a party is set up for the ten-year career of the complex: the Poohs are photographed near a giant polystyrene cake.

Roby, Dodi and Stefano, without Red, but accompanied by Valerio as singer, open a parenthesis at this point by recording under the name of Mediterraneo System a single with the songs Think about it? and Midnight in May. In 1977 they participated in the soundtrack of the television drama La gabbia, with the instrumental songs Risveglio and La Gabbia. Risveglio, facade A, also owes part of its popularity to an advertisement broadcast on television for a well-known company of modular kitchens. In that year they inaugurate an era of great concerts in the stadiums, laser beams, smoke on the stage, a splendor that will remain one of the symbols of the band for decades. In this period they participate in several episodes of Domenica In with Corrado. Anticipated by the summer 45 Give me just a minute, the LP Rotolando respirando is released, the first produced by the CGD, the new record company, with which the Pooh signed a contract after having separated from the previous CBS. Rolling Breathing is a record full of energy and vitality, which skilfully ranges from pop to the great rock energy of the song that gives the title to the album with the well-known solo by Dodi Battaglia, or to the notes of Ancora in a year, closing theme of their concerts until the dissolution of the group.

The disc is recorded twice as the mixes were completely wrong in the first session; to remedy the technical errors the Pooh chose to remix the album at the Stone Castle Studios of the Castello di Carimate, at the time among the most avant-garde in Europe. In February 1978 the Pooh 1975-1978 collection was released, consisting of 12 songs, 4 of which never appeared on L.P. (Woman really, It's nice to have you back, The cage and Waking up). The growing success led the Pooh to record another major LP, Boomerang (1978). For the first time there is a generous use of the synthesizer and numerous virtuosities on the electric guitar even in the sung parts. It is also the first LP in which the accompaniment of the strings is totally renounced.

The single Cercami / Giorno per giorno and songs like Pronto buongiorno è la sveglia, I'll think about it tomorrow with Red's fretless bass in the foreground, Classe '58 and Il Ragazzo Del Cielo (Lindbergh) are highly successful and most loved songs. by fans. Paolo Steffan, former member of Capsicum Red and of the duo Genova & Steffan as well as a great friend of Red Canzian, designs the logo still used by the group. At the beginning of 1979 the single Fantastic Fly / Odissey was released, the soundtrack of the television drama Fantastic Tales, based on the stories of Edgar Allan Poe. In the same year Viva comes out and the Poohs sell over 700,000 copies.
Songs like Io sono vivo that stays on the charts for over 51 weeks, Notte A Sorpresa, Ultima Notte Di Caccia, Everything Now, In Concerto are among the most loved and requested songs by fans. With Io sono vivo and Notte A Sorpresa, Pooh inaugurated the fashion of making promotional videos for singles. The pieces of the disc are combined with the 1979-1980 season of the Domenica In television program.

1980s
In 1980 the Pooh released the album Hurricane, a record in which the Pooh rearranged in English the most important pieces of the last three years designed for the foreign market. The disc fails to enter the American and English charts and is therefore also released in Italy, where it becomes gold. Subsequently, the disc ... Stop of 1980 inaugurates the new decade with the single I will sing for you (side B Wind season) and other famous songs such as Inca, Vienna, Midnight air, Ali to look, eyes to fly.

In February 1981 the Pooh 1978-1981 collection was released, consisting of 12 songs, 2 of which never appeared on L.P. (Day by day, You are yours you are mine). In September 1981, Buona fortuna was released on the Italian market, containing tracks such as the summer single Chi fermerà la musica, Buona fortuna, the autobiographical Banda nel vento (formerly side B of the single) and Dove sto Tomorrow. A well-known video clip of Who will stop the music is shot in which the Poohs swap roles telling the story of any group.

In the spring of 1982 the Pooh released Palasport, their first live album, a double vinyl recorded during the 1981 autumn tour. In the live, which traces the first 15 years of the group's career, there are also two unreleased songs played specifically for the tour: Song for the winter and We are all like us. In the autumn of the same year the 45 rpm single Non Siamo in Danger is released (side B Years without breath).

Following the fashion of the great groups of the time, the Pooh decided to go abroad to record their works. Tropico del Nord from 1983 is recorded in the studios of Montserrat, in the Caribbean. It is the first Italian LP to be also marketed on CD, with an extra track (Breakfast in New York). For the first time on a record of the group there is a song, Solo Voices, performed a cappella. Born to celebrate the Beatles of Because, the song uses the same compressor used by the English group for the recordings of their records [no source]. During the recordings of Tropico del Nord, the Pooh make the video clips of the songs of the disc, which are included in a special called The Year of the Tropico then distributed on VHS. No official singles are extracted from this LP, but many songs are chosen as promotional singles, even for the foreign market. After a tour in the great spaces, the Pooh decide to undertake, along the lines of many American groups, a tour in the smaller clubs. The Club Tour 83 sees the Pooh re-propose live songs left on the sidelines such as Eleonora my mother, Infiniti noi, Classe '58 and The city of others.

During the recordings of the disc, Facchinetti composes most of the songs that will be included in his first solo album, entitled Roby Facchinetti. In 1984 the Pooh flew to Maui, Hawaii to record the Aloha album in George Benson's studios. During their Hawaiian stay the Pooh recorded the eight tracks that make up the LP and Canzone per Lilli which is only offered in the CD version. The disc, in addition to "light" songs such as Boys of the World or Come We Will, also contains pieces with a darker tenor such as Wild and The Day Before, which imagines the results of a nuclear conflict between the United States and the Soviet Union, a theme very much felt at the time. The main song of the disc is La mia donna, a song written by Roby in Italy and definitively arranged at the "Lahina" studios in Maui. Interpreted by the four who divide the cantato of the stanzas; this piece is distinguished by the virtuoso solo by Dodi Battaglia. In the disc you can feel the strong presence of the Fairlight synthesizer that characterizes the latest musical productions of the band.

The following Italian tour sees Stefano appear on stage equipped with a new electronic drum set to replace the traditional one. Live performances are introduced by Roby's synthesized sounds to the tune of Selvaggio. From their Hawaiian stay, the Poohs bring a special of over an hour to Italy, a special that is offered in prime time by Rai. The special consists of video clips of the songs made on the island with the comments and anecdotes of the artists. It was released in 2003 as the band's first official DVD. At the end of the year the fourth collection of the band comes out, Pooh 1981-1984 and everything that has ever appeared on L.P .. The album is double and consists of 19 tracks of which 9 never appeared on LP and 7 never appeared on CD.

In 1985 Dodi also released his first solo album, Più in alto che c'e, with the collaboration of Vasco Rossi in the homonymous song. Asia non Asia, of the same year, is the new work of the Poohs recorded in Japan. The result is a disc full of synthetic guitars and keyboards. The song If there is a place in your heart, first interpreted exclusively by Stefano D'Orazio, is chosen as the closing theme of the program Il corso del monday, while Se nasco another time is used for the launch of the disc and participates also at the Festivalbar. In 1986 a collection published by Vedette was released entitled There is love in your eyes.

In 1986, to celebrate the twenty years of the group, Days of Infinity were released on a completely white vinyl support. The sound recalls the origins of the group and mixes old style acoustics and new technologies. Noteworthy is the wind section coordinated by Demo Morselli and also composed by Amedeo Bianchi and Claudio Pascoli. The commitment of this album is underlined by songs such as Terry B., inspired by a news story that happened in Milan the previous year starring the American model Terry Broome, C'est difficile mais c'est la vie, un particular piece with a piano introduction performed by Roby Facchinetti, Venti, an autobiographical piece in which the Poohs play with the chronological / atmospheric double meaning of the title. The Hammond organ is also back, giving a sixties atmosphere to the piece L'altra parte del cielo.

Red publishes his first solo work, Me and Red, which sees the collaboration of great Italian artists. The Poohs are immortalized at the wax museum in Rome and appointed Knights by the President of the republic. The 1986 winter tour was released on triple vinyl and in 1987 Goodbye was released, the second live album. In 1987 the album The color of thoughts with the ecologist Acqua dalla luna was released. The Poohs return to talk about politics in On the other side, a song that talks about the wind of change that is going through the Soviet Union.

In 1988, with the album Oasi, the Poohs began to collaborate with the WWF. The social commitment of the Pooh continues along the lines of the previous album: the theme of the destruction of the planet runs after in In the grass, in the water and in the wind, the growth of racial discrimination in Without Borders, without leaving behind the melodic pieces that more have distinguished their style, as in What do you want it to be and the sweet The girl with the eyes of the sun sung by Stefano D'Orazio. In 1989 the Pooh put on the market, in a limited edition, the instrumental piece Concerto per un'oasi, a maxi 45 whose proceeds were donated entirely to the WWF. In the same year the collection Another thought was released.

1990s
The nineties open for the ensemble with one of the few successes that were still missing from their almost twenty-five-year career: in March they won the Sanremo Festival with the song Men alone, which they sing in combination with Dee Dee Bridgewater, who will record the version in English song, titled Angel of the Night. At the end of the first performance of the piece, Battaglia reveals that twenty years earlier the group had tried, unsuccessfully, to take part in the demonstration. Shortly after the Festival, the homonymous album of the proposed song is released, which contains successful songs such as L'altra donna (written and sung by Dodi Battaglia), Giulia marries (written and sung by Stefano D'Orazio) and Tu vivrai ( in collaboration with Eros Ramazzotti, Umberto Tozzi, Raf and Enrico Ruggeri).

Also in 1990, in December, a double collection was released: 25: our story. From this album will be born a long tour in theaters. In 1992 the success of Pooh is witnessed by a record, The sky is blue above the clouds, from which the singles Maria marea, 50 springs, Stare senza di te and La miaface are chosen. With this album ends the first part of the collaboration of Fio Zanotti and the Pooh, which began in 1986, with Days of Infinity. The Poohs leave Fio Zanotti and in an interview they declare: «Zanotti used the arrangements and sounds that he had used in our works also in his other works».

In 1993, relations within the group began to break down, with Red, Dodi and Stefano banning Roby from participating in the Sanremo Festival with the song Vivrò, featured in Facchinetti's second solo work, Fai col cuore.

1994 is a year of transition, the Pooh record an album of unreleased songs: Musicadentro, a disc arranged by Dodi Battaglia in a very energetic way, played almost entirely in direct, with the aim of conveying all the energy of the group, as if it were a record played live. The package of the disc is studied at the table by the Poohs and the record company, and probably inspired by the "metal box" of Public Image Ltd. they decide to insert the CD in a round metal box. For the radio promotion, Le Songs of Tomorrow and A hundred years of being wrong are chosen as singles, of which video clips are also made.

The album fails to break through, missing a strong hit that can drag the album's sales, which settle around 100,000 copies, making it the least-sold album by Pooh since they switched to a major in 1971. Dodi Battaglia he writes Behind the hill, Senza musica senza parole, a piece with a Latin flavor with a text by Stefano which ensures that each sentence is linked to the previous one through the last word. A lion in heaven is a dedication to his father Medardo, who died that year.

In 1995 in May their third live album, double, entitled Buonanotte ai pianatori (Goodnight to the players) was released (the song of the same name is the only unreleased). In December of the same year a collection was released to celebrate the forthcoming 30 years of his career: it is called PoohBook, and it consists of 6 CDs for a total of 86 tracks. Red Canzian publishes his first book entitled Tree Magic. Stefano D'Orazio decides to publish a fanzine, the Poohnews, which from Musicadentro onwards has told the gestation, anecdotes and curiosities of each upcoming band's work.

Pooh is back in the limelight thanks to the album Amici per semper, from 1996, which launches songs such as Amici per semper, La donna del mioamico, Cercando di te. The new Poohs remain faithful to their music, renewing themselves in the arrangements, partly following the fashion of the moment. Ironically, despite the title, this will be the hardest gestation album of their entire career. The four, in fact, almost do not speak to each other, every opportunity is good to argue and the "music machine" seems to have seriously come to an end. They tear up the group in particular a clash over music and who should sing The silence of the dove and on a text by D'Orazio dedicated to the father who died the year before and rejected by the other members and replaced with Always in love, never in love. Dodi secretly thinks about leaving and records the album separately from the rest of the group. [9] In the end, the common sense of the four and the success of the new album prevent the end of the adventure. The arrangements of the disc are entrusted to Emmanuele Ruffinengo, a young arranger already with the Pooh during the recording sessions of Men alone and the subsequent tour. Ruffinengo has the task of reviving the glories of the group after the recent record failure of Musicadentro, and the modern and very rock sounds seem to prove them right: the record is one of the most appreciated and played by the radios, receiving a wide consensus also from the public.
In February 1997, to celebrate the thirtieth anniversary of the Poohs, the first biography of the group was published by Arnoldo Mondadori Editore. It is called "What you do not know", as a success of the sixties, and is edited by the journalist and critic Franco Dassisti. In November of the same year another collection comes out, a double anthology entitled The Best of Pooh which collects 28 hits by the group, plus two unreleased songs recorded for the occasion, Brava la vita, which is chosen to shoot a promotional video clip and Non leave me never again which in the long run will be the luckiest of the two pieces.

In 1998 the collection A minute before dawn was released, the first CD of the 6 that made up the Poohbook box set released between 1993 and 1995. The Poohs, who since 1990 have returned in possession of part of their catalog of the sixties, decide to publish the best pieces of those years in a rearranged and re-sung version in a modern key, with the current members of the band trying their hand at songs that have passed into the oblivion of memory, such as Brennero 66, E after this night and La solita storia.

In 1999 Un posto felice was released: singles such as Dimmi di Sì, Se balla da solo and Mi manchi are among the most important pieces of the year and allow Pooh to participate in the Festivalbar and to fill squares and stadiums, finding the relationship large audience that seemed lost after a few missteps in the mid-nineties. In particular, Dimmi di Sì by Stefano D'Orazio stands out for its Eurobeat sound from the seventies, which partially anticipates the subsequent works of the group.

The Poohs give Mediaset the opportunity to defer the last leg of their summer tour, which stops in the city of Arezzo. A VHS of the concert is also obtained which includes the whole concert and some scenes taken backstage. Mediaset had, among other things, already broadcast in 1991 the 25th anniversary concert, held in September of that year at the Arena Garibaldi in Pisa. On that occasion it was the last date of the 25 Summer Tour: La Nostra Storia.

2000s
The millennium opens with Cento di These Lives (2000) which returns to the sound of the seventies, an interesting work that certainly shows more commitment and character than the previous one. Many singles are extrapolated from this record, among which stand out Stay with me, The breaths of the world, A great love and the closing song, You can feel me still, song dedicated to a fan tragically died in a car accident, piece with a tail instrumental.

In 2001, to celebrate their 35-year career, the Poohs decide to publish a celebratory collection, Best of the Best, presented in two versions: the first is composed of a double CD; the second from a single CD, which includes a "live" track extracted from the Cento di These Lives tour. In both versions there are three unreleased. Portami via, written by Red Canzian, is the single intended for radio promotion and the singles market. The second unpublished is And you arrive, a sweet ballad written by Dodi Battaglia on a text by Stefano D'Orazio. The song, despite being of excellent workmanship, goes almost unnoticed on the radio, despite the Pooh including it in the tour destined to tour Italy to promote the album. The third unreleased is Figli, an anticipation of what the Pinocchio album will be the following year.

In the collection, the version of Sons is arranged much more rock than the later version presented in the musical. On the Best of the Best tour the Pooh present, in an instrumental version, the opening song of the musical, Once upon a time. In August 2002 they received the "Best Italian Group Award" from the review of the best live Music Facts directed by Ruggero Pegna, an award they will also receive in subsequent editions.

The Poohs begin to lay the foundations for the musical project. The direction of the show is entrusted to Saverio Marconi. Originally, the idea of the Musical included a completely different story from the one brought to the stage, in fact Roby was writing music on the idea of Gabriel, a future messiah imagined by Facchinetti himself. Given the difficulty in intertwining music with history, Saverio Marconi advises the Poohs to choose another subject and this is found in Pinocchio, one of the most read books in the world that has just returned to the screens with the film by Roberto Benigni.

From this experience the album Pinocchio, of 2002, will be extracted, in which the Pooh contain the 11 songs most suitable to be proposed even outside the context of the musical, varying in some cases a few verses. The musical, staged by the Compagnia della Rancia, becomes one of the most viewed shows in recent years and is replicated throughout the peninsula. For the premiere of the show, the Teatro della Luna was built, near the Assago Forum, near Milan. The record gets good critical acclaim, but sales are lower than previous records. The launch single, also distributed as a single CD, is Il Paese dei Balocchi, subsequently other singles destined for radio programming will be extracted from the CD such as I want to go away, Life, A true friend.

In 2003 Pinocchio-the great musical was released, a double CD with the music of the show, played by a young group of musicians and interpreted by the protagonists of the musical. The only intervention of Pooh on the record is the acoustic guitar of Dodi Battaglia su Vita. The drums are played by Red Canzian's son Philipp.

In the same year Dodi released an instrumental album, D'assolo. Some sacred monsters of the Italian guitar collaborate on the disc, Franco Mussida and Maurizio Solieri, who play in the song Nordinfesta. The definitive push for the release of the album comes from Roby Facchinetti who, hearing Dodi's 10 songs, convinces him to present it on the record market. The disc is presented live at RadioItalia, in the Cologno Monzese studios and at the Agorà Theater in Cernusco sul Naviglio.

Also in 2003, the first DVD of the Poohs, Aloha, was released with the restored films made during the Hawaiian stay in 1984. The DVD includes the seven promotional video clips shot for the special aired for RAI. Only the best tempos are missing from the record. Furthermore, in February of the same year, Pooh received the "Music and solidarity" award from the Nomads for their initiatives in favor of Rock No War, on the occasion of the 11th "Tributo ad Augusto", an event that the Emilian band organizes annually in Novellara in memory of the late frontman Augusto Daolio.

In these years the Pooh gets a new notoriety also among young people, also thanks to the sitcom Camera Café, where one of the protagonists, Paolo Bitta (played by Paolo Kessisoglu) is an avid fan of the group; the Poohs themselves have participated as a guest star in four episodes of the series (The Poohs Are Coming, The 40 Years of the Poohs, The War of the Poohs and The Spell of the Poohs). 
The album was toured in the spring and summer of the same year. Great success in particular for the concert on 19 August in Reggio Calabria which saw the participation of over 100,000 people and the live audio and video of RTL 102.5. The 2008 tour will be the only one organized for the Poohs by Milano Concerti, affiliated with the multinational Live Nation: after this brief experience, the ensemble returns to the Di Palma-Cusolito agency.

Still on the subject of covers, in 2008 and 2009 the Pooh participated in three albums by other artists. With Neri per Caso, in the album Different angles, they reinterpret their Little Katy. With Ornella Vanoni, in the duet album Più di me, they sing Eternity (by Claudio Cavallaro and Giancarlo Bigazzi) recorded by the ensemble I Camaleonti and by Vanoni herself. Finally, in 2009, with Claudio Baglioni, they recorded a rearranged version of Che begli amici, a historic piece by the Roman singer-songwriter re-proposed in the Q.P.G.A. released in November of the same year. In mid-April 2009, the press agencies broke the news that, following the release of a new album entitled Ancora una Notte Together (2 CD), which took place on 8 May, and the subsequent tour departing on 18 July from the Royal Palace of Caserta, drummer Stefano D'Orazio intended to leave the group after 38 years of association.

The tour, whose number of dates has grown during the course of the work (from 4 to 38), was closed by two special evenings at the Mediolanum Forum in Assago, the second of which was broadcast live on radio by RTL 102.5 and the subject of television coverage. and live links in the X Factor television broadcast on Rai 2. From 1 October 2009 the Poohs have remained in three: Roby, Dodi and Red. The Italian videoclip Prize, an event in the videomusical sector, has assigned the Special Prize to the videoclip Ancora una Notte Together directed by Andrea Falbo and Andrea Gianfelice. On 26 November a book is released that traces the band's almost 44 years of career: Our years without breath, published by Rizzoli.

2010s
In February 2010, Pooh announced the release of Aladin, a musical written by Stefano D'Orazio with the participation of his three former colleagues, authors of the music: the group had been working on the project even before the drummer's decision to leave Pooh. On 5 March the DVD containing the footage of the last concert in Assago on 28 and 30 September will be released.

In a press conference held on 3 March 2010, the Poohs reveal their future plans, announcing the continuation of the group's activity with a three-person line-up (tested with two concerts in Canada at the Fall View Casino, near Niagara Falls), and the intention to use a session player on drums, specifically Steve Ferrone, former drummer for international artists such as Eric Clapton, Bee Gees, Tom Petty and George Harrison. [10] Steve Ferrone therefore plays in the new album, Where the sun begins, released on 12 October 2010. The single from the new album, also titled Where the sun begins, is a rock musical suite with lyrics and atmospheres that bring the group back to opera like their Parsifal and Time, a woman, the city. The version on the album is divided into two parts, one of six minutes sung and one of five instrumental.

The Poohs in the three-man formation, with Red Canzian, Dodi Battaglia and Roby Facchinetti
On the Where the sun begins tour, the Poohs play, as well as with Ferrone, with an additional guitarist and keyboardist, the second also their arranger (respectively Ludovico Vagnone and Danilo Ballo [11]) chosen among the best-known names in the sector. The tour begins on 23 November in Rimini and continues until summer 2011 touching various Italian cities, and then resumes from January 2012 in Legnano and continues with a long series of concerts around the world. In the concerts of the 2011 and 2012 tour, no longer Steve Ferrone performs on drums, but Phil Mer, son of Red Canzian's wife.

In the concerts of this tour, the Pooh have always sold out, reaching a total of about 500,000 admissions. On 29 April 2011 the three Poohs find themselves on the same stage with Stefano D'Orazio in the TV program Ciak si cantta, live from Naples.

On 11 October 2011, Dove Comincia Il Sole Live - 27 August 2011 - Castello di Este is released, available in three versions: a double CD, a double DVD and the luxury edition with special contents that include the complete recording of the concert held in Este. On 22 and 23 October they perform two concerts in Canada, at Niagara Falls, accompanied by the World Rock Symphony Orchestra of Toronto. On 28 October they are in Sofia, Bulgaria, where they hold a concert at the Palace of Culture with the Classic FM Orchestra.

On 18 November, the Poohs return to TV after the mini-tour performing in the program The best years of Carlo Conti. Since 29 November the Pooh with a note published on their site have their official page on Facebook, Twitter and YouTube.

On 6 March 2012, Pooh Legend is released, a box set edited by Andrea Pedrinelli consisting of 4 DVDs and four books with over 10 hours of films, many of which are unpublished. For 9 October 2012 the group announces the release of the new work entitled Second Opera; then begins a tour in the main theaters throughout Italy accompanied by the Ensemble Symphony Orchestra conducted by Maestro Giacomo Loprieno.

On 3 January 2013 Valerio Negrini suddenly died of a heart attack while on vacation in Trentino. The unexpected death of Valerio throws the Pooh into despair and raises new unknowns about the future of the group. In early July, the Poohs return to the stages of outdoor theaters and summer arenas with the summer tour of Opera second on tour. On 29 October, Pooh Box, the box set in memory of Valerio Negrini, is released. The work contains a double CD and double DVD live of the Opera second concert on tour, a 200 page Graphic Novel POOHdiSEGNI illustrated by the designer Gianni D'Angelo which tells the story of the band and two CD Voci per Valerio which include 28 songs interpreted by most important Italian voice actors including Christian Iansante, creator of the project. From 2 November, the Poohs return to the stages of theaters in Italy, Canada and the United States, with the last part of the tour which recorded a great success with the public with more than 150,000 appearances during almost 100 dates throughout Italy, also in Europe and overseas.

Reunion and retirement
On 28 September 2015, Pooh announced the "reunion" operation which saw the return of Stefano D'Orazio on drums and Riccardo Fogli on vocals for a series of projects, including seven event concerts distributed as follows: two at the San Siro Stadium in Milan, one at the Olympic Stadium in Rome, one at the San Filippo Stadium in Messina, three at the Verona Arena. In the following months, a triple album and a live DVD taken from the concerts in Milan are announced, and the tour between September and December in the sports halls and exhibition centers. Five-voice reinterpretations of the historical pieces Pensiero, Noi due nel mondo e nell'anima, Chi Fermerà la Musica, Piccola Katy, Pierre are published, as well as the unpublished Tante stories ago, The things I want, One more song and Goals, all included on the triple live album Pooh 50 - Last Night Together, released on 16 September.

On 30 December 2016, Pooh officially ended their musical career holding the last concert at the Unipol Arena in Casalecchio di Reno, in an event broadcast live via satellite in Italian cinemas and live on television and radio on RTL 102.5. On 6 June 2017 the Poohs return to the Verona Arena for the Wind Music Awards. A widely announced conclusion: in an interview a few months earlier, Red Canzian had stated that "The Pooh will continue to follow their history, their discography and protect the socio-cultural heritage they represent, but they will no longer make records or concerts together".

On 14 July 2017 Trilogia 1987-1990 was released on CD and vinyl, a celebratory special box that contains the albums Il colore dei Pensieri, Oasi and Uomini Soli, as well as a bonus disc extracted from Live in Milan (Piazza Duomo 1990). Both versions contain a 60-page booklet with stories, unpublished images and memorabilia. [14] On 23 November 2018, the triple album and a live DVD taken from the last concert in Casalecchio di Reno, entitled Pooh 50 - The last embrace, was released.

On 6 November 2020, after a week of hospitalization, the drummer Stefano D'Orazio died following complications due to COVID-19.

Discography

Studio albums and compilations
Per quelli come noi (1966)
Contrasto (1968)
Memorie (1969)
Opera prima (1971)
Alessandra (1972)
Parsifal (1973)
I Pooh 1971–1974 (1974)
Un po' del nostro tempo migliore (1975)
Forse ancora poesia (1975)
Poohlover (1976)
Rotolando respirando (1977)
I Pooh 1975–1978 (1978)
Boomerang (1978)
Viva (1979)
Hurricane (1980)
...Stop (1980)
I Pooh 1978–1981 (1981)
Buona fortuna (1981)
Palasport (1982)
Tropico del nord (1983)
Aloha (1984)
I Pooh 1981–1984 (1984)
Anthology (1985)
Asia non Asia (1985)
Giorni infiniti (1986)
Goodbye (1987)
Il colore dei pensieri (1987)
Oasi (1988)
Un altro pensiero (1989)
Uomini soli (1990)
La nostra storia (1990)
Il cielo è blu sopra le nuvole (1992)
Musicadentro (1994)
Buonanotte ai suonatori (1995)
Poohbook  (1995)
Amici per sempre (1996)
The Best of Pooh (1997)
Un minuto prima dell'alba (1998)
Un posto felice (1999)
Cento di queste vite (2000)
Best of the Best (2001)
Pinocchio (2002)
Pinocchio – Il grande Musical (2003)
Ascolta (2004)
La grande festa (2005)
Noi con voi (2006)
Noi con voi – Versione integrale (2007)
Beat Regeneration (2008)
Per quelli come noi (Remastered) (2008)
Ancora una notte insieme (2009) (ITA # 2 – Platinum)
Dove comincia il sole (2010)
Dove comincia il sole live (2011)
Opera seconda (2012)

Singles
Vieni Fuori (Keep On Running) \ L'uomo Di Ieri (10 February 1966)
Bikini Beat \ Quello Che Non Sai (Rag Doll) (29 April 1966)
Brennero '66 \ Per Quelli Come Noi (3 October 1966)
Nel Buio (I Looked In The Mirror) \ Cose Di Questo Mondo (15 April 1967)
In Silenzio \ Piccola Katy (2 February 1968)
Buonanotte Penny \ Il Tempio Dell'Amore (16 October 1968)
Mary Ann \ E Dopo Questa Notte (9 April 1969)
Goodbye Madame Butterfly \ Un Minuto Prima Dell'Alba (17 November 1969)
Tanta Voglia Di Lei \ Tutto Alle Tre (28 April 1971)
Pensiero \ A Un Minuto Dall'Amore (28 September 1971)
Noi Due Nel Mondo e Nell'Anima \ Nascerò Con Te (21 April 1972)
Cosa Si Può Dire Di Te \ Quando Una Lei Va Via (21 October 1972)
Io e Te Per Altri Giorni \ Lettera Da Marienbad (5 June 1973)
Infiniti Noi \ Solo Cari Ricordi (5 September 1973)
Se Sai, Se Puoi, Se Vuoi \ Inutili Memorie (20 May 1974)
Per Te Qualcosa Ancora \ E Vorrei (5 November 1974)
Ninna Nanna \ È Bello Riaverti (25 July 1975)
Linda \ Donna Davvero (21 July 1976)
Risveglio \ La Gabbia (23 March 1977)
Dammi Solo Un Minuto \ Che Ne Fai Di Te (28 September 1977)
Cercami \ Giorno Per Giorno (28 April 1978)
Fantastic Fly \ Odissey (11 December 1978)
Io Sono Vivo \ Sei Tua, Sei Mia (16 May 1979)
Notte a Sorpresa \ Tutto Adesso (16 November 1979)
Canterò Per Te \ Stagione Di Vento (14 April 1980)
Chi Fermerà La Musica \ Banda Nel Vento (21 April 1981)
Buona Fortuna \ Lascia Che Sia (16 November 1981)
Non Siamo In Pericolo \ Anni Senza Fiato (21 October 1982)
Se Nasco Un'Altra Volta \ Per Chi Merita Di Più (20 June 1986)
Donne Italiane \ Davanti Al Mare (11 December 1989)
Uomini Soli \ Concerto Per Un'Oasi (2 February 1990)
Se Balla Da Sola (23 March 1999)
Dimmi Di Sì (23 July 1999)
Portami Via (19 October 2001)
Il Paese Dei Balocchi (25 October 2002)
Capita Quando Capita (21 April 2004)
Ascolta (1 September 2004)
Per Dimenticare Te (17 December 2004)
La grande festa (18 November 2005)
Cuore Azzurro  (25 May 2006)

Band members
Roby Facchinetti (born 1944), vocals and keyboards (1966–2016)
Dodi Battaglia (born 1951), vocals and guitars (1968–2016)
Stefano D'Orazio (1948–2020), vocals and drums (1971–2009, 2015–2016)
Red Canzian (born 1951), vocals and bass (1974–2016)
Riccardo Fogli (born 1947), vocals, bass, guitar (1966–1974, 2015–2016)
Valerio Negrini (1946–2013), drums (1966–1970)

References

External links
Official website
 

 

Musical groups established in 1966
Musical groups disestablished in 2016
Musical groups from Bologna
Italian pop music groups
Sanremo Music Festival winners
Symphonic rock groups
1966 establishments in Italy
2016 disestablishments in Italy